The 1931 North Carolina Tar Heels baseball team represented the University of North Carolina at Chapel Hill in the 1931 NCAA baseball season. The team claimed a Southern Conference championship.

References 

Southern Conference baseball champion seasons
North Carolina Tar Heels baseball seasons